Richard Wyche may refer to:

 Richard of Chichester (1197–1253), or Richard Wyche, saint and Bishop of Chichester
 Richard Wyche (merchant) (1554–1621), London shipowner and merchant